The depopulation of the Great Plains refers to the large-scale migration of people from rural areas of the Great Plains of the United States to more urban areas and to the east and west coasts during the 20th century. This phenomenon of rural-to-urban migration has occurred to some degree in most areas of the United States, but has been especially pronounced in the Great Plains states, including Texas, Oklahoma, Kansas, Nebraska, South Dakota, North Dakota, Montana, Wyoming, Colorado, and New Mexico. Many Great Plains counties have lost more than 60 percent of their former populations.

Depopulation began in the early 1900s, accelerated in the Dust Bowl years of the 1930s, and has generally continued through the national census in 2010. The population decline has been broadly attributed to numerous factors, especially changes in agricultural practices, rapid improvements in urban transit and regional connectivity, and a declining rural job market.

Geography

Definitions vary as to what land comprises the Great Plains, but the Plains are generally agreed to overlap with the territory of ten states: Colorado, Kansas, Montana, Nebraska, New Mexico, North Dakota, Oklahoma, South Dakota, Texas and Wyoming. The eastern boundary is about 97 degrees W longitude and the Plains extend westward to the Rocky Mountains and southward from the border with Canada to the approximate latitude of Austin, Texas.

The Great Plains are distinguished by generally flat land and a natural vegetation cover consisting mostly of expansive grasslands. The eastern part of the Great Plains is dominated by agriculture, with wheat being the most common and important crop. The western part is more arid and is primarily used for grazing cattle and irrigated agriculture.

Population history
Large-scale settlement of the Great Plains by farmers and ranchers began with the end of the Civil War in 1865. By the late 1870s the Plains Indians had been defeated militarily and were largely confined to reservations. Drawn by the free land made available by the Homestead Act, pioneer families quickly settled the region such that nearly all of the arable land was privately owned or on Indian reservations by 1900.

The initial rush to settle the Great Plains by hundreds of thousands of farmers and ranchers has been reversed because of several factors. Perhaps the most significant reasons have been economic. Over the course of the 20th century, farm economies saw dramatic shifts from small-scale family subsistence farming to larger commercial farms utilizing more equipment and less labor. Many family farms proved to be too small to survive. Farmers also used farming techniques which were unsuited to the dry, windy climate and the frequent droughts of the Great Plains. This became manifest during the Dust Bowl years of the 1930s, in which rural flight from the Great Plains accelerated, although the decline in population of some counties had begun as early as 1900. Better roads and the automobile permitted many farmers to live in larger towns and cities rather than on the farm itself. While urban areas on the Great Plains more than doubled in population, thousands of small towns and communities disappeared. Two-thirds of counties lost some part of their population between the early 1900s and the 2010 census, and, as the table below demonstrates, many rural counties lost more than 60 percent of their population. A few counties lost more than 80 percent of their population. Population density of some Great Plains counties dipped below two persons per square mile.

Governments have tried a variety of methods to stem the outflow of population from rural areas in the Great Plains. Some towns have offered free building lots to prospective residents, but the program has met with only limited success. The fundamental problem appears to be the few employment opportunities available in these small and isolated communities.

The population decline has led to proposals to return the land to its natural state and under public ownership. The Buffalo Commons proposal calls for large portions of the drier regions of the Great Plains to be returned to their original condition as pasture land for American bison and other plains animals.

Counties with large population losses
The following Great Plains counties lost more than 60 percent of their population from their census when they attained their highest population until 2010.

Sources: , Population of Counties by Dicennial Census, 1900-1990, accessed 12 August 2021; . accessed 24 May 2022

See also
Rural flight
Prairie madness

References

Great Plains
Dust Bowl
Demographics of the United States
Demographics of Colorado
Demographics of New Mexico
Demographics of Oklahoma
Demographics of South Dakota
Demographics of Texas
American diaspora in North America
Demographic history of the United States
Internal migrations in the United States